Toghli Alabad (also Romanized as Ţoghlī Ālābād; also known as Ţoghlī and Toqlī Ālābād) is a village in Howmeh-ye Gharbi Rural District, in the Central District of Ramhormoz County, Khuzestan Province, Iran. At the 2006 census, its legal population was 348, in 55 families.

References 

Populated places in Ramhormoz County